Franziska "Fränzi" Schmidt (born 5 July 1943) is a Swiss former figure skater who competed in ladies' singles. She is a three-time Swiss national champion. She finished in the top ten at two European Championships and competed at two Winter Olympics, placing 22nd in 1960 and 23rd in 1964.

Results

References

Swiss female single skaters
1943 births
Olympic figure skaters of Switzerland
Figure skaters at the 1960 Winter Olympics
Figure skaters at the 1964 Winter Olympics
Living people